Matthew McCauley may refer to:

 Matthew McCauley (politician) (1850–1930), Canadian politician
 Matthew McCauley (producer), Canadian-born American composer and record producer